Falling in Between is the twelfth studio album (though counted as the 13th album overall — see Toto XIV) by American rock band, Toto. The album was released in February 2006 on the Italian label Frontiers Records, the band supporting the album with a world tour. It was the band's first studio release since Through the Looking Glass in 2002, the last one with lead vocalist Bobby Kimball and the only one with keyboardist/vocalist Greg Phillinganes. Phillinganes originally began playing with Toto as a touring replacement for David Paich, who had retired from the road. Another Porcaro brother, Steve, continues to work in the studio with the band, though he also retired from touring following the Fahrenheit album in 1987. Similarly, Lenny Castro has never been a member of the group, but has consistently contributed to their recordings since their first album in 1978. This is also the band's last studio album to feature bassist Mike Porcaro and drummer Simon Phillips; Porcaro retired from touring in the following year due to symptoms of ALS taking away the use of his hands and died in 2015 (though he would posthumously appear on the 2018 album Old Is New on 3 tracks; Fearful Heart, Spanish Sea and Oh Why?). Phillips left the band in 2014 to focus on his solo career.

Other guest artists appearing on the album include then-former lead vocalist Joseph Williams, saxophonist Tom Scott, Ian Anderson of Jethro Tull, Chicago trombonist James Pankow and former Chicago bassist and vocalist Jason Scheff.

Reception

AllMusic's review of the album was mixed (3.5/5), considering the first half of the album overly safe and commenting that Toto was "a band trying to find itself during a midlife crisis." However, they praised Steve Lukather's vocals and the band's "amazing production values".

Track listing

Personnel
Bobby Kimball – lead and backing vocals
Steve Lukather – guitars, lead and backing vocals, piano on "Simple Life"
Mike Porcaro – bass guitar
David Paich – lead and backing vocals, keyboards 
Greg Phillinganes – lead and backing vocals, keyboards 
Simon Phillips – drums, percussion, drum programming

Additional musicians
Joseph Williams – co-lead and background vocals on "Bottom of Your Soul"
Steve Porcaro – synthesizers on "Dying on My Feet", "Hooked", "Let it Go", and "No End in Sight"; sound design on "Falling in Between", "King of the World", "Hooked", "Taint Your World", and "No End in Sight"
Ian Anderson – flute on "Hooked"
L. Shankar – violin on "Falling in Between", backing vocals on "Falling in Between" and "Bottom of Your Soul"
James Pankow – trombone and horn arrangement on "Dying on My Feet"
Ray Herrmann – tenor saxophone on "Dying on My Feet"
Lee Thornburg – trumpet on "Dying on My Feet"
Tom Scott – tenor saxophone on "Spiritual Man"
Roy Hargrove – trumpet and flugelhorn on "The Reeferman"
Jason Scheff – backing vocals on "Falling in Between", "Bottom of Your Soul", and "King of the World"
Trevor Lukather – backing vocal on "Hooked"
James Tormé – backing vocal on "Hooked"
Monet – backing vocal on "Spiritual Man"
Lenny Castro – percussion on "Dying on My Feet", "Bottom of Your Soul", "Simple Life", "Let It Go", "Spiritual Man" and "No End in Sight"

Production
Produced by Toto
Mixed by Steve McMillan
Engineered by Simon Phillips
Assistant Engineer: Stefan Nordin
Additional engineering by Niko Bolas, Steve Barri Cohen, Mike Ging, John Jessel and Phil Soussan.
Recorded at Phantom Recordings (Sherman Oaks, California).
Additional recording at ATS Studios (Calabasas, California) and Steve Cohen's Studio.
Mastered by Stephen Marcussen at Marcussen Mastering (Hollywood, CA).
Project Coordinator: Anita Heilig
Artwork: Jim Evans
Photography: Pamela Springsteen
Management: The Fitzgerald Hartley Co.

References

External links
Falling in Between

2006 albums
Toto (band) albums
Frontiers Records albums